Matt Green is an English actor and comedian.

Education
Green read English at Christ's College, Cambridge and graduated in 2000. He was a member of the Footlights alongside Richard Ayoade, John Oliver and John Finnemore and became president during his final year with Finnemore as vice president. After graduating he remained to direct the year-end tour and did some screenwriting on the side before his break into comedy.

Stand-up comedy

Green started performing stand up comedy in 2003. He was placed second at the Hackney Empire New Act of the Year in 2005, and later that year went on to perform in The Comedy Zone at the 2005 Edinburgh Festival Fringe alongside Isy Suttie, Russell Kane and Mark Olver.

He has performed six solo stand up shows at the Edinburgh Fringe:

 2016: "Matt Green: Writing to Harvey Keitel" at the Pravda Room, Epsionage on the Edinburgh Free Fringe
 2013: "Matt Green: Alive" at the Pleasance Jack Dome
 2011: Matt Green: Too Much Information at the Pleasance Upstairs
 2010: Matt Green: Bleeding Funny at the Pleasance Baby Grand
 2009: Matt Green: Truth & Pleasure at the Pleasance Hut
 2008: Matt Green: Grow Up Green at the Pleasance 10Dome

Matt performed stand up comedy as part of Arthur Smith and Friends at the Glastonbury Festival in 2008, a performance which was recorded and broadcast on BBC Radio 4 as part of the programme Arabella Churchill: The First Lady of Glastonbury.

Acting

Radio
His credits include Constable Twitten in the BBC Radio 4 comedy series Inspector Steine and as Apsley Cherry-Garrard in the BBC Radio 4 classic serial The Worst Journey in the World.

Matt has also appeared in other BBC Radio 4 programmes:

Cabin Pressure
Ed Reardon's Week
The Afternoon Play: Man of Steel
The Time Being: Autarky
High Table, Lower Orders

Television
In 2011, Green starred in the one off BBC Christmas show Lapland.

 Fresh Meat
 Cradle To Grave
 Casualty
Comedy Showcase: "Other People"
Extras
EastEnders
Comedy Lab: "Speeding"
Footballer's Wives TV
Garth Marenghi's Darkplace
Two Pints of Lager and a Packet of Crisps

Film
Finding Neverland
Ali G Indahouse

Writing
Co-creator and co-writer (alongside Robin French and Kieron Quirke) of the pilot for ABC Family sitcom Roommates.

Writer on The Now Show on BBC Radio 4 in March 2012 and The News Quiz on BBC Radio 4 in March 2014.

References

External links
Official Website

Alumni of Christ's College, Cambridge
English male comedians
English male film actors
English male radio actors
English male television actors
English stand-up comedians
Living people
Year of birth missing (living people)